This is a list of Kannada feature films released by the Kannada film Industry located in Bangalore, Karnataka in the 1930s.

See also 

 Kannada cinema

References

External links
 Kannada Movies of 1930s at the Internet Movie Database

1930s
Kannada-language
Films, Kannada